Been to the Future is the solo album by Joey Eppard, the lead vocalist and guitarist for the band 3.

Track listing
 "Static" – 3:10
 "Balloon" – 5:05
 "Been to the Future" – 5:00
 "Stranded in a Treetop" – 3:56
 "Lay Down the Law" – 3:46
 "Simple Words" – 3:58
 "The Game" – 2:56
 "Faster" – 3:53
 "Paint by Number" – 3:25
 "Helpless Belvedere" – 3:20
 "Puddle" – 4:19
 "Vinegar Hill" – 2:21
 "Trail of Tears" – 5:48
 "Amaze Disgrace" – 6:22
 "Blood Lust Tusks" – 2:42

Credits
 Joey Eppard — Vocals, guitar, songwriting.
 Billy Riker — Electric guitars (on Future, Balloon, and Trail of Tears).
 Robert Burke — Bass guitar (on Stranded in a Treetop). Drums and percussion, recording, mixing, producing (Stranded in a Treetop and Static).
 Bruce Berky — Recording, mixing (Paint by Number, Amaze Disgrace, Faster and  Lay Down the Law).
 Julie Last — Recording (The Game and Puddle).
 Erik Sacino | Solar Gravity Studios — Back Cover Artwork

External links
Official 3 Site - Been to the Future

2002 albums